Whitcher is a surname. Notable people with the surname include:

Frances Miriam Whitcher (1811–1852), American humorist
Mary Whitcher (1815-1890),  American Shaker trustee, school teacher, and author
William Whitcher (1832-1910), English cricketer
Neil Whitcher, lead guitar of  Cuff (band)
W.F. Whitcher, a notorious 19th century obsessed bibliomaniac